Chris Clark may refer to:

 Chris Clark (reporter) (born 1938), American reporter, former lead news anchor for WTVF-TV Nashville, Tennessee
 Chris Clark (writer) (born 1945/6), British author who writes about unsolved crimes
 Chris Clark (singer) (born 1946), American soul singer
 Chris Clark (historian) (born 1960), Australian historian
 Christine Clark (born 1962), American long-distance runner, also known as Chris Clark
 Chris Clark (deminer) (born 1964), British mine action expert
 Chris Clark (ice hockey) (born 1976), American professional ice hockey right winger
 Clark (musician) (Chris Clark, born 1979), British electronic musician and composer
 Chris Clark (footballer, born 1980), Scottish footballer
 Chris Clark (politician) (born 1983), mayor of Mountain View, California
 Chris Clark (footballer, born 1984), English footballer
 Chris Clark (American football) (born 1985), player on the Houston Texans American football team

See also
 Chris Clarke (disambiguation)
 Christopher Clark (disambiguation)
 Christy Clark (born 1965), Canadian politician